Models of the Runway is a television series on the Lifetime network.  It was an offshoot of Project Runway appearing each week during seasons when Project Runway aired, generally immediately following the broadcast of the latest episode, and following the experiences of the fashion models on Project Runway, focusing on their social interactions and weekly eliminations. It ran for two seasons and like Project Runway it was hosted by Heidi Klum.

Format
The models are housed together throughout each season.  Consequently, many friendships, some conflicts, and occasional animosities can be observed.  Also, because fashion modeling is a competitive occupation, Models of the Runway examines rivalries among the models, relationships with the fashion designers, cosmetic techniques, and individual personalities, as well as career histories and aspirations.

Near the end of each show, a selection process occurs, during which Project Runway fashion designers choose which model they wish to work with for the week.  All of the models stand in a runway lineup with Heidi Klum in the center, while the designers sit on the ground floor facing them.  The models appear by wearing the same outfit (barefoot and a short black shift dress).  The sequence by which designers select models is based upon how high they scored during the preceding episode's design competition as well as random pick from a bag:  The winning designer has first pick, the runner-up selects second, the lowest-scoring designer picks last, etc.  Because there is one more model than the number of designers at the beginning of the selection process, one model remains unpicked at the end, and will be sent home.  Thus, the surviving designer with the lowest score during the previous week plays the most important role in determining which model will be eliminated.

The scene when the just-eliminated fashion designer meets with the models is often poignant, since the model associated with that designer has a strong likelihood of leaving soon.  The closing sequences of each program also tend to be tear-evoking, as the surviving models gather around the eliminated model and bid her farewell.  Tim Gunn also appears during the final scenes, typically complimenting the model and reminding her that she must promptly pack up and head home.  It was announced that Models of the Runway will not return for a third season.  Instead, Austin Scarlett and Santino Rice are starring in their own show "On the Road with Austin and Santino".

Models

Season 1 models (Season 6 of Project Runway)

Season 2 models (Season 7 of Project Runway)

See also
Project Runway (season 6)
Project Runway (season 7)

References 

Boston Herald; One Herald Square; Boston, MA 02118
https://web.archive.org/web/20100729192023/http://news.bostonherald.com/entertainment/television/general/view.bg?articleid=1270843
"Heidi Klum struts into eighth season with 90-minute ‘Project’" By Amy Amatangelo, Thursday, July 29, 2010  Excerpt:  "She did concede that Lifetime’s decision to give “Runway” another half-hour might have something to do with the cancellation of “Models of the Runway,” the 30-minute show that followed the catwalkers who wore the contestants’ designs"

External links

Models of the Runway on TV.com

Models of the Runway on RealityTVmagazine
Models of the Runway on BuddyTV

Models of the Runway)
2000s American reality television series
2010s American reality television series
2009 American television series debuts
2010 American television series endings
English-language television shows
Fashion-themed reality television series
Lifetime (TV network) original programming
Television series by Bunim/Murray Productions
Reality television spin-offs
Television series by The Weinstein Company
American television spin-offs